Jean-Hugues Ratenon (born 25 June 1967) is a French politician representing Rézistans Égalité 974. He was elected to the French National Assembly on 18 June 2017, representing the department of La Réunion. He was re-elected in 2022.

See also
 2017 French legislative election

References

1967 births
Living people
Deputies of the 15th National Assembly of the French Fifth Republic
Deputies of the 16th National Assembly of the French Fifth Republic
Politicians of Réunion
La France Insoumise politicians
Black French politicians
Members of Parliament for Réunion